Batavia High School may refer to:

Batavia High School (Illinois)
Batavia High School (New York)
Batavia High School (Ohio)